Aleksandra Kluś-Zamiedzowy (born July 31, 1986 in Zakopane, Poland) is an alpine skier from Poland. She competed for Poland at the 2014 Winter Olympics in the alpine skiing events.

References

1986 births
Living people
Olympic alpine skiers of Poland
Alpine skiers at the 2014 Winter Olympics
Polish female alpine skiers
Universiade medalists in alpine skiing
Sportspeople from Zakopane
Universiade silver medalists for Poland
Universiade bronze medalists for Poland
Competitors at the 2007 Winter Universiade
Competitors at the 2009 Winter Universiade
Competitors at the 2011 Winter Universiade
21st-century Polish women